Miss Earth México 2011, the tenth annual national beauty pageant of Miss Earth México, was held on September 17, 2011 in Quintana Roo, Municipality of Othon P. Blanco. Claudia Mollinedo of Tabasco, crowned the winner Casandra Ananké Becerra Vázquez from Distrito Federal.

The winner of Miss Earth México 2011 represented México in the international Miss Earth 2011 pageant which was held on December 3, 2011 at the University of the Philippines Theater in Diliman, Quezon City, Philippines. She placed in Top 8 and won special award Best in Evening Gown

Results
The following is the outcome of the pageant:

Special awards
Special awards were given during the Miss Earth México 2011 coronation night as follows:

Delegates
The following is the list of delegates that represented the 32 States of Mexico as listed in the Miss Earth Mexico 2011 website including their height and age during the pageant:

See also
Miss Earth Mexico

References

External links
Official Website

2011
2011 in Mexico
2011 beauty pageants
September 2011 events in Mexico